The Dadia Forest is a large area of natural woodland in the Evros regional unit in northeastern Greece. The forest consists mostly of oak and pine. It is one of the most important areas in Europe for birds of prey, and the only forest in Europe where all four European species of vulture can be seen.

Geography
The forest is located in northeastern Greece, to the northeast of Alexandroupoli close to the border with Turkey, where the eastern end of the Rhodope Mountains are largely uninhabited and unspoiled. The area is one of tree-covered rolling hills, the Evros Hills, reaching up to about  but without any high peaks. The underlying rocks are igneous, some being alkaline and others acidic. Most of the area is forested, but there is some scrubland, grassland and cultivated areas. The trees are mostly oaks and pines, with some areas of primary forest and other areas of secondary, regenerated growth.

Flora

The dominant trees in Dadia Forest are Turkish pine, black pine, and three species of oak. Growing among these are cornelian cherry, smoke bush, eastern hornbeam, hop hornbeam, wild service tree and turpentine tree. Herbaceous plants, herbs and bulbous plants include paeonies, various orchids, dwarf iris, Iris reichenbachii, Fritillaria pontica, wild tulips, Crocus pulchellus and Colchicum.

Fauna
About 36 species of mammal have been recorded in the protected area as well as 40 species of reptile and amphibian, but it is as a bird reserve that the forest is best known. 36 of the 38 diurnal species of European birds of prey are present, as well as 6 nocturnal species (owls). All four native European species of vulture, the black, bearded, Egyptian and griffon vultures are found here; Dadia is the only forest in Europe where this happens. Eagles are plentiful, with several pairs of golden eagle nesting in the protected area. Smaller raptors include lanner falcon, levant sparrowhawk and horned owl. Both black and white storks breed here, and among the smaller birds are semicollared flycatcher, roller, masked shrike and eastern Bonelli's warbler. Altogether, 219 species of bird have been recorded.

Visitor information
The forest is a fully managed protected area and is visited by about 35,000 visitors each year. These bring economic benefits to the village of Dadia and to the wider area. Other facilities include an Ecotourism Centre, an information centre, and a coffee shop and restaurant. Cars are not permitted, but minibus ecotours are organised, and visitors can follow the trails on foot. There is a hostel near Dadia and various tracks through the forest.

References

Forests of Greece